The Mafia Is No Longer What It Used to Be is a 2019 Italian satirical documentary film directed by Franco Maresco. It is intended as a follow-up to Belluscone: A Sicilian Story (2014). It was selected to compete for the Golden Lion at the 76th Venice International Film Festival. At the Venice Film Festival, the film won the Special Jury Prize.

Synopsis
In 2017, on the twenty-fifth anniversary of Capaci and via D'Amelio bombings, where the Sicilian Mafia murdered antimafia judges Giovanni Falcone and Paolo Borsellino, director Franco Maresco wonders what's left of their ideals and struggles in contemporary Sicily, dwelling on its relationship with the Mafia through one of his usually darkly comic "anthropological" documentaries.

While discussing with renewed photographer Letizia Battaglia about the shallow institutionalization of antimafia by Italian politics, Maresco meets again Ciccio Mira, the shady Mafia-apologist concert organizer that four years earlier had been the subject of his documentary Belluscone: surprisingly, Mira seems a changed man, seeking some kind of redemption by organizing a Neomelodic concert in Palermo in tribute of Falcone and Borsellino. However, his words still betray some nostalgia for the "good old Mafia that used to be".

Cast
 Letizia Battaglia
 Ciccio Mira
 Matteo Mannino, Mira's right-hand man
 Cristian Miscel, a Neomelodic singer
 Franco Zecchin, a photographer about the Mafia
 Pino Maniaci

Production
The film was produced by Rean Mazzone and Anna Vinci with Ilapalma-Dreamfilm and Tramp Limited. Associate Producers have been Il Saggiatore, Stefano Casertano - Daring House, Moretti & Petrassi Holding, Amateru.

References

External links
 

2019 films
2019 documentary films
Italian documentary films
2010s Italian-language films
Black-and-white documentary films
Documentary films about Sicily
Films about the Sicilian Mafia
Venice Special Jury Prize winners